Parliamentary elections were held in Croatia on 29 October 1995 to elect the 127 members of the Chamber of Representatives. The election was held in conjunction with special elections for Zagreb City Assembly, which resulted with Zagreb Crisis.

The result was a victory for the Croatian Democratic Union (HDZ), which won an absolute majority of 75 seats. Voter turnout was 68.8%.

This was the last election to date in Croatia in which a single party won enough seats to govern alone, without the need for parliamentary support from pre-election or post-election coalition partners.

Background
The term of the existing Chamber of Representatives was to expire one year later, in 1996. However, Croatian government of Franjo Tuđman and his Croatian Democratic Union party hoped to exploit national euphoria over the success of Operation Storm. Chamber of Representatives was quickly dissolved, but not before passing yet another piece of electoral legislation, introducing new voting system which was to improve chances of ruling party.

According to the new electoral law, 32 seats were won in individual constituencies on First past the post basis, while 80 seats were to be distributed on the basis of proportional representation, with the threshold being raised from previous 2% to 5%.

Another addition was raised threshold for lists of party coalitions - 8% for coalition of two parties and 11% for coalition of three and more parties. It is more than obvious that the new rules were introduced to discourage coalitions of small opposition parties and subsequently have their votes dispersed and wasted below the threshold, allowing stronger party to get additional seats.

While 12 seats were kept for Croatian expatriates, number of seats reserved for ethnic minorities have changed. This was most evident in case of Serbs, who had only 3 seats compared with previous 11.

Under such conditions, opposition parties were more concerned about their own political survival than actually challenging ruling party. Learning from their mistakes during 1992 elections, they created ad hoc coalitions and circumvented electoral thresholds by fielding other parties' members as their own candidates on the lists.

Results
The HDZ received a similar percentage of vote and number of seats as three years earlier. More significant changes were among the ranks of the opposition; the Social Democratic Party re-emerged as significant political factor with 9% of the vote, at the expense of Croatian Social Liberal Party saw its vote share almost halved. Neither party was as successful as the large opposition coalition which included Croatian Peasant Party, Croatian People's Party and Istrian Democratic Assembly.

The most tense moment of the campaign occurred during the vote count. It appeared that Croatian Party of Rights would fail to break the 5% threshold, only for the vote to mysteriously increase afterwards.

Subsequent changes
The following changes happened after elections:
The Croatian Pure Party of Rights gained one member of parliament
The Croatian Christian Democratic Union gained one more member of parliament
The Serb People's Party lost one member of parliament
The Independent Democratic Serb Party gained one member of parliament
The Liberal Party gained four members of parliament
The Istrian Democratic Forum gained one member of parliament
The Croatian Independent Democrats lost one member of parliament
Social Democratic Action of Croatia lost one member of parliament

Notes

References

External links
Rezultati izbora zastupnika za Zastupnički dom Sabora Republike Hrvatske (29.10.1995.) 

Elections in Croatia
Croatia
1995 in Croatia
Croatia
1995 elections in Croatia